The Pacific Basin Economic Council (PBEC) is an independent business association founded by Weldon B. Gibson in 1967 with the objective of facilitating business in the Asia-Pacific region. It has a rich history of supporting business leaders, academics and Governments across Asia Pacific. It organises and hosts several roundtable dialogue discussions and key events annually as well as provides market intelligence, research papers & policy recommendations on behalf of the APAC business community. It advocates for sustainable & inclusive economic growth through free trade agreements under a fair international rules based system that mitigates climate change & supports societies. The International Secretariat is currently located in Hong Kong and their Chief Executive is Michael Walsh.

History
The Institute of Pacific Relations (IPR) was founded in 1925 as an international forum where national delegations representing a broad range of interests could meet and discuss both domestic and regional issues.
The IPR was a respected forum in the period before, during and after World War II, but was disbanded in 1961 after the United States withdrew support.
PBEC was one of the organizations that filled the void.  It was founded in 1967 by business leaders from the United States, Canada, Australia, New Zealand and Japan. Later the founders were joined by groups of members  from other countries in the region such as South Korea, Mexico, Hong Kong, Malaysia and the Philippines.

The purpose of the Pacific Basin Economic Council is providing high level engagement between business leaders and Government officials through a regional network of local representative country chapters. Its mission is to create and maintain an environment that facilitates the orderly conduct of sustainable & responsible economic development within & between the 21 APEC Members States.  
The organization is funded by its patron, corporate & individual members.
The organization is informal in the sense that it does not include official government representation and membership is strictly 'by Invitation Only".
At the council's 12th general meeting in Los Angeles in 1978 the Pacific Economic Community Plan was proposed, calling for an economic community to coordinate solidarity and cooperation between countries of the region at different stages of development.
As of 1993 the PBEC was the main non-government organization involved in economic cooperation in the Pacific region. However today it focuses on its Members needs and represents them in front of Government, when tackling some of the most important economic decisions in Asia.

Activities

The Pacific Basin Economic Council promotes a fair based regulatory environment for all its members in the region. It advises governments on ways to improve society issues, the wider business environment and cross-border digital trade barriers. It helps generate direct foreign investment (DFI) and encourages new technology development and deployment while avoiding environmental degradation where possible.

Serving as the independent voice of business in the Pacific, PBEC provides authentic Intelligence through its platform for the diversity of industry, services and professions that have made Asia and the Pacific the world's growth region. PBEC has been a driving force in the region for the past five + decades, advocating environmental awareness, the UNSDG's, corporate social responsibility, ESG Reporting and transparency through its regional country chapters and executive committee. It provides policy advocacy and partners with like-minded organizations such as the Asian Development Bank (ADB) / Organisation for Economic Co-operation and Development (OECD) Anti-corruption Initiative, Pacific Economic Cooperation Council (PECC), Asia Pacific Economic Cooperation (APEC),  Horasis-The Global Visions Community and the United Nations Global Compact.

References

Sources

Further reading

International economic organizations
International organizations based in Asia
Organizations established in 1967